Seeon may refer to:

Seeon-Seebruck, a municipality in the district of Traunstein in southern Bavaria in Germany
Seeon Abbey (Kloster Seeon), a monastery in the municipality of Seeon-Seebruck